Dong Maku station is a railway station located in Takhli Subdistrict, Takhli District, Nakhon Sawan. It is located 198.800 km from Bangkok railway station and is a class 3 railway station. It is on the Northern Line of the State Railway of Thailand.

Train services
 Ordinary 201/202 Bangkok-Phitsanulok-Bangkok
 Ordinary 207/208 Bangkok-Nakhon Sawan-Bangkok
 Local 401/402 Lop Buri-Phitsanulok-Lop Buri

References 
 Ichirō, Kakizaki (2010). Ōkoku no tetsuro: tai tetsudō no rekishi. Kyōto: Kyōtodaigakugakujutsushuppankai. 
 Otohiro, Watanabe (2013). Tai kokutetsu yonsenkiro no tabi: shasō fūkei kanzen kiroku. Tōkyō: Bungeisha. 

Railway stations in Thailand